Traffic regulations may refer to:
 Motor vehicle traffic regulations (rules of the road)
 Highway Code in the United Kingdom
 Traffic code in the United States
 Vienna Convention on Road Traffic for international standards
 Air traffic control
 International Regulations for Preventing Collisions at Sea